Dragan Kokotović (Serbian Cyrillic: Драган Кокотовић) is a former Serbian football player who has become a football manager.

Kokotović played most of his career in the Yugoslav First League with FK Rad, but finished after playing three seasons in the Greek first division with PAS Giannina.

References

1953 births
Living people
Serbian footballers
FK Rad players
PAS Giannina F.C. players
Serbian football managers
Yugoslav football managers
PAS Giannina F.C. managers
Apollon Smyrnis F.C. managers
Apollon Pontou FC managers
Atromitos F.C. managers
Panserraikos F.C. managers
Expatriate football managers in China
Association football midfielders
Footballers from Belgrade